Richard J. Casull (February 15, 1931 – May 6, 2018) was a Salt Lake City-born gunsmith and wildcat cartridge developer whose experiments with .45 Colt ammunition in the 1950s led to the creation of the .454 Casull cartridge. Casull's passion was six-shooters, and he was determined to create a high velocity round for the .45 Colt. His goal was to achieve a muzzle velocity of 2,000 feet per second with Colt .45 rounds fired from a single-action Army-style revolver with a inch barrel. This proved impossible due to the tensile strength of the Colt .45 cylinder, so he set out to develop his own casing and bullet.

Casull began his career as a wildcat cartridge developer after having contact with Elmer Keith in the 1940s, an Idaho rancher, firearms enthusiast, and author.  Casull was instrumental in the development of the first magnum revolver cartridge, the .357 Magnum, as well as the later .44 Magnum and .41 Magnum cartridges. Casull was instrumental in the development of various wildcat cartridges, a few of which were later adopted as factory rounds.

Casull also worked with Oregon-based gunsmith P.O. Ackley, the famous wildcat cartridge developer. Ackley developed a family of improved wildcat cartridges by rechambering extant firearms and fireforming the ammunition to decrease body taper and increase shoulder angle, resulting in a higher case capacity. Ackley improved not only standard cartridges but was the creator of the first .17 caliber (4.5 mm) centerfire cartridge. He developed the .450 Ackley Magnum (based on a .375 H&H Magnum case necked up to .458) and the .475 Ackley Magnum (based on a .375 H&H Magnum necked up to .475 (12 mm)).

Casull .454 cartridge
Though he developed many wildcat cartridges for pistols and rifles, Casull is most famous for creating the .454 Casull cartridge in 1957 with Duane Marsh and Jack Fullmer. It was first announced in November 1959 by Guns & Ammo magazine. The basic design was a lengthened and structurally improved .45 Colt case. The wildcat cartridge finally went mainstream in 1997, when Ruger began chambering its Super Redhawk in this caliber. Taurus followed with the Raging Bull model in 1998 and the Taurus Raging Judge Magnum in 2010. Taurus also made a now-discontinued Rossi-branded R92 lever action carbine clone of the Winchester 1892 chambered for the .454 Casull. For brush hunting and wilderness packing, the Rossi R92 carbine .454 Casull offered optional magazine-tube loading and a recoil absorbing butt pad.

Mini Revolvers
Casull began developing a mini-revolver design, which was licensed by the short-lived Rocky Mountain Arms Corp. (RMAC) of Salt Lake City, Utah. In 1971, RMAC began producing a mini-revolver chambered in .22 Short. Casull's original design used  a lever attached to the hammer to lock the cylinder in place.  He later redesigned his mini-revolver to place the locking mechanism on the bottom of the frame, eliminating the lever attached to the hammer.  He was granted U.S. Patents 4228606 and 4228608 in 1980 for the mechanism for mounting the cylinder to the frame for the cylinder locking mechanism, respectively.

Freedom Arms
In 1978, Casull became a partner of Wayne Baker in the Freedom, Wyoming-based Freedom Arms firearms manufacturing business to produce a 5-shot mini revolver in .22 LR known as "The Patriot", later offered in .22 Short and .22 WMR, also a mini double action revolver, the Casull CA-2000 Mini. A 4-shot mini revolver was also produced by Freedom Arms. The production of mini-revolvers by Freedom Arms ceased in 1990.  Casull was granted U.S. Patent 4385463 in 1983 for a floating firing pin for mini revolvers and U.S. Patent 4450992 in 1984  for a belt buckle holster that would hold a mini revolver. The mini-revolver design was sold to North American Arms.

Single-Action Revolvers

Casull began building a number of 5-shot prototypes on Ruger Super Blackhawk frames. The Freedom Arms Model 83 single-action revolver chambered in .454 Casull was introduced in 1983. This model is still manufactured today as the Model 83.

A number of variants upon the Model 83 have been produced, all with five-shot cylinders. The first was a .45 Colt in February 1986, followed closely by a .44 Magnum version. In 1991, Freedom Arms introduced the Model 252 in .22 long rifle and in 1992 the model 353 in .357 Magnum. In 1993 the Model 555 was introduced in .50 Action Express. .41 Magnum and .475 Linebaugh chamberings were introduced in 1997 and 1999 respectively. Freedom Arms introduced their own .500 Wyoming Express in the Model 83 .500 WE in 2005.

The Model 97 design, with a Model 83 frame of reduced size, was introduced in 1997, originally with a six-shot .357 Magnum cylinder (.38 Special cylinder available). A five-shot .45 Colt chambering was introduced the following year, as was a five-shot .41 Magnum in 2000. Six-shot .22's are produced with .22 LR sporting and match-grade cylinders available, as well as .22 Magnum, from 2003. A five-shot .44 Special chambering came in 2004.

The Model 2008, introduced in 2010, is a single-shot pistol with interchangeable barrels, most in rifle chamberings.

Other gun manufacturers have since began manufacturing single-action revolvers chambered in .454 Casull.

Official Gun of Wyoming Proposal
In 2013, Wyoming State Rep. Richard Cannady (R-Glenrock) introduced a bill to make Freedom Arms Model 83 single-action revolver chambered in .454 Casull as Wyoming's official state gun.

See also
List of cartridges by caliber
List of handgun cartridges

References

1931 births
2018 deaths
20th-century American inventors
Gunsmiths
Ammunition designers
People from Salt Lake City